Kenneth Ekornes (born 7 July 1974 in Sykkylven, Norway) is a Norwegian jazz musician (percussion) and member of the 'Brazz Brothers', known from a number of recordings, as well as for his multiethnic musical expression and his creative use of electronics.

Career 

Ekornes is a graduate of the Rhythm program at Høgskolen i Agder and play in bands like Desafinado, Nymark Collective, Gumbo, Batagraf led by Jon Balke (Statements, 2005). He also appears on Jai Shankar's Ragajazz, and is in the new lineup of Ab und Zu.

He has collaborated with Trio de Janeiro, Føyk, Ole Paus, Baba Nation, Mari Boine (Eight seasons, 2002), Ingor Ánte Áilo Gaup, Trond-Viggo Torgersen (Barnetimen for de store, 2002) and Vintermåne (2002), Terje Gewelt/Bjørn Klakegg, Frode Alnæs. Med Unni Løvlid turnerte han Rikskonsertene med indisk folkemusikk (2006).  Tidligere har han turnert med oppsetningene Draumetid, samt  Kenneth i 100.

Discography 
With Zotora 
1998: Emigrate (Circular Recordings), including with Eivind Aarset

Within Føyk 
1999: Kraaka (Heilo)

Within Nymark Collective
2000: First Meeting (Sonor Records)
2002: Contemporary Tradition (Sonor Records)
2008: Bessie Smith Revisited Live in Concert (Nymark Collective Records), with Kristin Asbjørnsen

With Ahmad Mansour
2001: Apples and Oranges (Resonant Music)

With Vintermåne
2002: Vintermåne (2L)

With Geir Lysne
2002: Aurora Borealis – Nordic Lights (ACT Music), Suite For Jazz Orchestra
2003: Korall (ACT Music), G.L. Listening Ensemble featuring Sondre Bratland

With John Vegard Show
2002: Hvor Er Du? (Concordia Culture)

With Trond-Viggo Torgersen
2002: Barnetimen For De Store (EMI Records)

Within Skruk
2003: Krybberom (Kirkelig Kulturverksted), with Rim Banna
2003: Dype Stille Sterke Milde (Kirkelig Kulturverksted), with Nymark Collective
2010: I Vinens Speil (Kirkelig Kulturverksted), featuring Mahsa Vahdat
2010: Til Alle Tider (Kirkelig Kulturverksted), compilation

With Terje Gewelt
2004: Small World (Resonant Music)
2007: If Time Stood Still (Resonant Music)
2011: Selected Works (Resonant Music), compilation

Within Batagraf
2005: Statements (ECM Records)
2011: Say And Play (ECM Records)

Within Gumbo 
2006: Gumbo (Schmell Records)

With Frank Kvinge
2006: Small Stories (Ponca Jazz)

With Helene Bøksle
2006: Elverhøy (Polydor Records)

With Karl Seglem
2010: Ossicles (NorCD)

With Diom de Kossa
2010: Baba Toulenga (In My Fathers Shadow) (ta:lik)

With Chika Asamoto and Gus Till
2010: Catalpa (Les Vagues Records)

Within The Source
2012: The Source Of Summer'' (Grappa Music)

References

External links 
Ekornes i 100 med lyd on YouTube

1974 births
Living people
People from Sykkylven
20th-century Norwegian drummers
21st-century Norwegian drummers
Norwegian jazz drummers
Male drummers
Norwegian jazz composers
Male jazz composers
Avant-garde jazz musicians
ECM Records artists
University of Agder alumni
20th-century drummers
20th-century Norwegian male musicians
21st-century Norwegian male musicians
Geir Lysne Listening Ensemble members
Ab und Zu members